Andrea Nix Fine is an American documentary film director whose film Inocente won the Academy Award for Best Documentary (Short Subject) in 2013. She directs her films with her husband, Sean Fine. The Fines were also nominated for the Academy Award for Best Documentary Feature in 2007 for War/Dance, a story about the power of music to heal and transform the lives of children living in Uganda's war zone, and their 2013 HBO documentary Life According to Sam was honored with a Peabody and Emmy award. Nix is a 1991 graduate of Colby College. The Fines launched a boutique film studio Change Content to develop documentaries that affect way audiences feel about critical issues. Change Content's first film LFG (film) premiered at the Tribeca Film Festival and was instrumental in the U.S. Women's National Soccer Team achieving equal pay.

Life and career
Nix grew up in Rochester, New York and later attended Colby College. Nix made her first  film in a college class where the professor required the making of a documentary in place of a written term paper at the end. After her first day of shooting, she realized that filmmaking was what she wanted to pursue in life. She sought out numerous jobs after college where she could learn more about filmmaking, and went on to National Geographic in Washington, D.C., where she met her husband, Sean Fine. 

Nix went on to direct films around the world for National Geographic, notably in Naples, Costa Rica, and the Arctic Circle. She has stated that she loves that "making documentaries opens a rare and privileged door into the lives of others." In 2004, the Fines left National Geographic
and began their own production company Fine Films. After being contacted by the non-profit, Shine Global, the Fines went on to make a documentary film about the twenty-year-old civil war in Uganda called War/Dance. Nix was nominated for an Academy Award for Best Documentary Feature for War/Dance, which she produced with her husband, Sean Fine. The Fines went on to collaborate on the 2013 documentary film Life According to Sam, produced by HBO which went on to win a Peabody Award. 

In 2021 the Fines launched an impact studio Change Content. Change Content's first film LFG (film) was about the U.S. Women's National Soccer Team fight for equal pay.

Filmography
 War/Dance (2007)
 Lindsey Vonn: In the Moment (2011)
 Inocente (2012)
 Life According to Sam (2013)
 LFG (2021)

References

External links

American documentary film directors
Living people
Colby College alumni
Directors of Best Documentary Short Subject Academy Award winners
Year of birth missing (living people)
Place of birth missing (living people)